The  is an art museum located in the city of Toyota, Aichi Prefecture, Japan.

History 
The museum features works by Gustav Klimt, Egon Schiele, Edvard Munch, and others. The museum building was constructed by Yoshio Taniguchi, who also renovated the Museum of Modern Art (MoMA) in New York City.

Artists who have exhibited are Leiko Ikemura.

Public transport is with the Mikawa Line to Toyotashi Station.

External links 

Homepage of the Toyota Municipal Museum of Art
Show of Leiko Ikemura in the Toyota Municipal Museum of Art

Art museums and galleries in Aichi Prefecture
Toyota, Aichi
Museums established in 1995
1995 establishments in Japan